Colonel Thomas Stanley (14 September 1749 – 25 December 1816) was a British Whig politician who sat in the House of Commons for 32 years  from 1780 to 1812. He also served as Colonel of the 1st Royal Lancashire Militia.

He was the son of the Revd Thomas Stanley and educated at Manchester Grammar School and Trinity Hall, Cambridge. He was described as being of Cross Hall, Lathom near Ormskirk Lancashire.

He was a Member of Parliament (MP) for Lancashire from February 1780 until he retired from the House of Commons at the 1812 general election, having been elected unopposed at seven successive elections. In his long parliamentary career he spoke often in favour of the Lancashire cotton industry.

Colonel Stanley was also an avid book collector, with a focus on Literature and Fine Binding. As reported by T. F. Dibdin in his "Bibliographical Decameron" (1817, volume iii, pp 78–82), the Stanley Sale of 1813 (Bibliotheca Stanleiana) was a major event among bibliomaniacs, and was one of the most impressive libraries ever to be sold during the lifetime of the owner. Apparently, Stanley used the proceeds from the sale to retire in style.

He died 3 years after the sale, unmarried, aged 67.

References

History of Parliament - STANLEY, Thomas (1749-1816) of Cross Hill

1749 births
1816 deaths
Members of the Parliament of Great Britain for Lancashire
British MPs 1780–1784
British MPs 1784–1790
British MPs 1790–1796
British MPs 1796–1800
Members of the Parliament of the United Kingdom for Lancashire
UK MPs 1801–1802
UK MPs 1802–1806
UK MPs 1806–1807
UK MPs 1807–1812
People educated at Manchester Grammar School
Lancashire Militia officers
British Militia officers